Michael Jerome Boley (born August 24, 1982) is a former American football linebacker who played in the National Football League (NFL). He played college football at Southern Miss and was drafted by the Atlanta Falcons in the fifth round of the 2005 NFL draft.

Boley was also a member of the New York Giants and Cincinnati Bengals.

Early years
Boley played high school football for Elkmont High School as a safety, wide receiver, and running back.

College career
Boley played college football for Southern Mississippi. In 2004, he won the Conerly Trophy, which is awarded to the best college football player in the state of Mississippi. During his entire career he finished with 423 tackles, 28.5 sacks, nine forced fumbles and was a three-time First-team All-Conference USA  selection. In Boley's last season at Southern Miss he was voted as the conference's defensive most valuable player. He was also a finalist for several national defensive awards, including the Butkus Award, the Bednarik Award and the Lott Impact Trophy. He made 125 tackles as a senior and recorded five forced fumbles, two interceptions, and nine sacks.

Professional career

Atlanta Falcons
Boley was drafted by the Atlanta Falcons in the fifth round of the 2005 NFL draft. He took over as a starter in his rookie year after Edgerton Hartwell went down with an Achilles tendon injury. In four years with the Falcons, he started 52 of 64 games, recording 330 tackles, six sacks, and five interceptions. He became a free agent after the 2008 season.

New York Giants
On February 27, 2009, Boley signed a five-year, $25 million deal with the New York Giants. He won his first championship ring with the Giants in Super Bowl XLVI against the New England Patriots.

On February 5, 2013, Boley was released by the New York Giants.

Cincinnati Bengals
On October 1, 2013, Boley signed with the Cincinnati Bengals.

Personal life
In February 2013, Boley was arrested for child abuse.

References

External links
Cincinnati Bengals bio
New York Giants bio (archived from 2010)

1982 births
Living people
Sportspeople from Gadsden, Alabama
Players of American football from Alabama
American football linebackers
Southern Miss Golden Eagles football players
Atlanta Falcons players
New York Giants players
Cincinnati Bengals players